Man from Canyon City is a 1965 Spanish-Italian Spaghetti Western film directed by Alfonso Balcázar.

Plot 
This is the story of two prisoners Carrancho and Rad chained together and escape from jail. The joined in an outfit of Morgan, a ruthless mine owner. One works as henchman and another become the cook.

Cast

See also 
 Five Thousand Dollars on One Ace

External links

References 

1965 films
Italian Western (genre) films
Spaghetti Western films
Spanish Western (genre) films
Films directed by Alfonso Balcázar
1965 Western (genre) films
1960s Italian films